Wrigley Gulf is an embayment about 115 miles wide along the coastline of Antarctica, lying seaward of the Getz Ice Shelf. Nearly a right angle in plan, its limits are described by Grant Island, Dean Island, and Siple Island, which are partially or wholly embedded in the ice shelf.

Wrigley Gulf was discovered in December 1940 by the US Antarctic Service (USAS), and named for Philip Wrigley, a Chicago manufacturer who helped support the expedition.

Further reading 

 Andrew J. Hund, Antarctica and the Arctic Circle: A Geographic Encyclopedia of the Earth's Polar Regions, P 373
 Thomas Horst Kalberg, https://elib.suub.uni-bremen.de/edocs/00104869-1.pdf Geophysical investigation of the West Antarctic continental margin between Wrigley Gulf and the Amundsen Sea Embayment]

External links 

 Wrigley Gulf at USGS website
 Wrigley Gulf at SCAR website
 satellite image of the Wrigley Gulf
 a map of the Wrigley Gulf area

References 

Bays of Marie Byrd Land